KMLD is a commercial radio station located in Casper, Wyoming, broadcasting on 94.5 FM.  KMLD airs an oldies music format branded as "Melody 94.5".  The music programming is syndicated by Cumulus Media and is the True Oldies Channel.

All Mt. Rushmore Casper stations are located at 218 N. Wolcott in downtown Casper.

History
This station started at 97.3 FM in 1997, and was owned by Hart Media. The station was later sold along with the other Hart Media Stations to Mountain States Broadcasting. The station was sold once again when Clear Channel Communications bought Mountain States Broadcasting. The present owner is Mt. Rushmore Broadcasting. A short while after being bought by Mt. Rushmore, the station moved down to 94.5 FM.
Citing technical difficulties, the station, along with its five other sister stations went dark for a period of time in August 2011. KVOC, KMLD, and KHOC remained silent as of December 17, 2011. Other than equipment reasons, no further information as to why the three stations were off the air had been provided.

Fines
KMLD, along with other Casper stations owned by Mt. Rushmore Broadcasting were fined $68,000 for using unlicensed Studio/transmitter links, which the company had been using for 16 years. The FCC fined the company $68,000 for "willfully and repeatedly" violating the law, giving the stations' owner 30 days to get licenses for its STLs for KHOC, and sister stations KHOC, KASS, and KQLT.
In 2012, station owner Jan Charles Gray was named in a lawsuit by the U.S. Department of Labor for improperly paying employees. Gray called the claims in the lawsuit "bogus".

In 2013, Gray informed the Casper Star Tribune that the lawsuit and a $68,000 fine for unlicensed STLs were "a lot of baloney." Gray said if the FCC doesn't back down, he plans to "sue them on behalf of every radio owner in America that has been wronged by them".

Previous logo

References

External links
Melody 94.5 Facebook

MLD
Oldies radio stations in the United States
Radio stations established in 1997
Natrona County, Wyoming
1997 establishments in Wyoming